John Wells (born 12 May 1963) is a former captain and coach of Leicester Tigers rugby union team and presently defence coach for Rugby Colorno in Italy; he has previously been forwards coach for  and head coach for Newcastle Falcons.

Career

Wells was born in Driffield, Yorkshire.  He attended Magnus Grammar School and Loughborough University, where he studied sports science and recreation management.

Playing at blindside flanker, he played for England U-16, U-18, Students, U-23 and England 'A'.  He was not capped for England, though he did play in a non-cap international against Italy in Rovigo in 1990.

Wells made his debut for Leicester Tigers in 1982 away against Harlequins, and he went on to play for them over 360 times, captaining the side from 1991-93.  He is particularly noted for playing in a back row with England internationals Dean Richards at number eight and Neil Back at openside.

After Director of Rugby Bob Dwyer was sacked, Wells was appointed Leicester's forwards' coach, and deputy to Dean Richards.  When Richards was sacked in 2004 after a poor run of results, Wells took over as head coach. He retained this role until the end of the 2004/2005 season, when he left to take up a coaching role at the National Academy.

In 2006 he was appointed as England forwards' coach to assist then head coach Andy Robinson, alongside attack coach Brian Ashton and defence coach Mike Ford. He remained in this position after first Brian Ashton and then Martin Johnson took charge of the team.

In 2012 Wells joined Newcastle Falcons on a short term contract until the end of the season, taking a permanent role as forwards coach under new Director of Rugby Dean Richards that summer. He was promoted to head coach in the summer of 2014.

In April 2020 Wells moved to Rugby Colorno in Italy to become their defence coach, finishing this role recently.

References

External links 
 England profile
 Data from Leicester site
 Planet rugby stats

1963 births
Living people
English rugby union players
English rugby union coaches
Alumni of Loughborough University
Leicester Tigers players
Leicester Tigers coaches
Sports scientists
People from Driffield
People educated at Magnus Church of England School
Rugby union players from Yorkshire
Rugby union flankers